Chapkut is an abandoned village in the Chambarak Municipality of the Gegharkunik Province of Armenia.

External links 

Former populated places in Gegharkunik Province